Kovářov is a municipality and village in Písek District in the South Bohemian Region of the Czech Republic. It has about 1,400 inhabitants.

Administrative parts
Villages and hamlets of Březí, Chrást, Dobrá Voda, Hostín, Kotýřina, Lašovice, Onen Svět, Předbořice, Radvánov, Řenkov, Vepice, Vesec, Vladyčín, Zahořany, Záluží and Žebrákov are administrative parts of Kovářov.

Geography
The eastern part of the municipal territory with the Kovářov village lies in the Vlašim Upland. The western part lies in the Benešov Uplands and borders the Orlík Reservoir. The territory is rich in small ponds.

History
The first written mention of Kovářov is from 1220.

Sights
The landmark of Kovářov is the Church of All Saints. The early Gothic church from the 13th century was expanded with Baroque towers in 1712.

Notable people
Jan of Předbořice, 14th century priest and abbot

Twin towns – sister cities

Kovářov is twinned with:
 Seftigen, Switzerland

Gallery

References

External links

Villages in Písek District